Campo Blenio was a municipality in the district of Blenio in the canton of Ticino in Switzerland.

On 25 January 2005, the cantonal authorities announced that Campo Blenio would merge with Aquila, Ghirone, Olivone and Torre to form a new municipality to be called Blenio. This union was carried through on 22 October 2006.

References

External links

 
 Official site 
 Cantonal Portal 

Former municipalities of Ticino